The 1826 United States Senate election in Pennsylvania was held on December 12, 1826. Isaac D. Barnard was elected by the Pennsylvania General Assembly to the United States Senate.

Results
The Pennsylvania General Assembly, consisting of the House of Representatives and the Senate, convened on December 12, 1826, to elect a Senator to serve the term beginning on March 4, 1827. Two ballots were recorded. The results of the second and final ballot of both houses combined are as follows:

|-
|-bgcolor="#EEEEEE"
| colspan="3" align="right" | Totals
| align="right" | 133
| align="right" | 100.00%
|}

References

External links
Pennsylvania Election Statistics: 1682-2006 from the Wilkes University Election Statistics Project

Pennsylvania
1826
United States Senate
December 1826 events